Glen Boss (born 21 August 1969 in Caboolture) is an Australian jockey, who is best known for riding Makybe Diva to victory in three consecutive Melbourne Cups: 2003, 2004, and 2005. He has also been successful in four Cox Plates: Makybe Diva in 2005, So You Think in 2009, Ocean Park in 2012, and Sir Dragonet in 2020.

At the end of May 2021 he had ridden 1,893 wins, including 90 Group One wins, for total prize money of A$180 million.

References

External links
Official Glen Boss Website
Spring Racing Carnival profile
Glen Boss A star of his craft

Australian jockeys
Australian Thoroughbred Racing Hall of Fame inductees
People from Gympie
1969 births
Living people